Hoshin may refer to:

 Hoshin Kanri, a strategic planning methodology (Plan-Do-Check-Act) developed by Yoji Akao, used to create goals, assign them measurable milestones, and assess progress against those milestones
 Hoshin Budo Ryu, an American martial arts system
 Anzan Hoshin Roshi, leader of the White Wind Zen Community

See also 
 Battle Houshin: (Commonly misspelled, "Hoshin") is another name for the game known as "Mystic Heroes"